Case is the debut album by American singer Case. It was released by Def Jam Recordings on August 13, 1996. The album peaked at number seven on the US Top R&B/Hip-Hop Albums chart and reached number 42 on the US Billboard 200. Case was supported by four singles, including "More to Love" and "Touch Me, Tease Me" featuring Foxy Brown and Mary J. Blige which became the album's most successful single on the Billboard Hot 100, peaking at number 14. In a 2020 interview with BET, Case remarked that he disliked recording the album and admitted he did not have a lot of creative freedom within the album.

Critical reception

Allmusic editor Leo Stanley found that "on his eponymous debut, Case manages to be tough without sacrificing his soul. Case keeps his hard edge by telling things straight, refusing to embellish his tales with meaningless boasts. [It] would have a stronger punch if the music was a little more forceful and varied, but even so, the record is a refreshing debut — it proves that the genre hasn't exhausted its potential quite yet."

Commercial performance
The album reached number forty-second on the US US Billboard 200 album chart, also reaching the seventh position on the US R&B Albums.

Track listing

Sample credits
"More to Love" contains a sample of "The Payback" as performed by James Brown and "Somethin' Funky" by Big Daddy Kane.
"Don't Be Afraid" contains a sample of "6 Minutes of Pleasure" as performed by LL Cool J.
"Call a Cab" contains a sample of "Bring the Pain" as performed by Method Man.
"I Gotcha" contains a sample of "Guillotine (Swordz)" as performed by Raekwon featuring Inspectah Deck, Ghostface and GZA; contains an interpolation of "Mary Jane (All Night Long)" as performed by Mary J. Blige; and a vocal interpolation of "As" as performed by Stevie Wonder.
"Touch Me, Tease Me" contains a sample of "P.S.K. (What Does It Mean?)" as performed by Schoolly D.

Charts

References

1996 albums
Case (singer) albums
Def Jam Recordings albums